Crown for Christmas  is a 2015 American made-for-television romantic comedy film starring Danica McKellar and Rupert Penry-Jones. The film premiered on Hallmark Channel on November 27, 2015, as part of their Countdown to Christmas seasonal programming block.

Plot

Alison "Allie" Evans (Danica McKellar) is an American hotel maid who was fired for not getting an important guest's room ready in time. Overhearing this, a hotel patron's servant, Fergus (Pavel Douglas), hires her to be a governess for his employer's daughter in the country of Winshire. When Allie accepts and arrives in the country, she finds that Fergus' employer is widower King Maximillian (Rupert Penry-Jones) and that his daughter is Princess Theodora (Ellie Botterill) who has become mischievous since her mother's death. But, she meets her match in Allie, as Allie single-handedly raised her younger brother and sister following their parents' deaths.

When not busy looking after the princess, Allie befriends the other staff members. All while King Maximillian is being pressured by Chancellor Riggs (Colin McFarlane) to become engaged to Lady Celia (Alexandra Evans). Theodora has some objections to this as she thinks Allie would be a better match. When the party arrives, Allie is invited, much to the jealousy and irritation of Lady Celia and to hers and Max’s dismay, the wedding ring has gone missing.

Production
The film's story was written by former 80's pop singer Michael Damian, who is known for writing other royalty-themed Christmas movies such as A Princess for Christmas and A Royal Christmas. The film was shot in Romania and Slovenia.

Cast
 Danica McKellar as Allie Evans
 Rupert Penry-Jones as King Maximillian
 Ellie Botterill as Princess Theodora
 Cristian Bota as Carter
 Alexandra Evans as Countess Celia
 Pavel Douglas as Fergus
 Amy Marston as Miss Wick
 Colin McFarlane as Chancellor Riggs
 Emma Sutton as Mrs. Claiborne

References

External links
 
 
 
 

2010s American films
2015 television films
2015 films
2015 romantic comedy films
American romantic comedy films
Hallmark Channel original films
Christmas television films
Films directed by Alex Zamm